HMS Wilton has been the name of a number of Royal Navy vessels:
 , a Type II 
 , the first minesweeper of GRP construction

Royal Navy ship names